Parhelophilus brooksi is a rare species of syrphid fly observed in northern North America.  Hoverflies can remain nearly motionless in flight. The adults are also known as flower flies for they are commonly found on flowers, from which they get both energy-giving nectar and protein-rich pollen. The larvae  of this species are unknown but in this genera larvae are of the  tong-tailed type (rat-tailed)

Distribution
This is a nearctic species found in British Columbia, Wisconsin, Minnesota and Quebec.

References
 

Hoverflies of North America
Hoverflies
Eristalinae
Insects described in 1927
Taxa named by Charles Howard Curran